"Come Back and Stay" is a song that was first recorded in 1981 by its writer Jack Lee. In 1983, singer Paul Young released his version as a single from his album, No Parlez, and it became an international hit. The song reached number 4 on the UK Singles Chart.

Chart performance

Weekly charts

Year-end charts

Certifications and sales

Pop culture
The song was featured in the 2006 video game, Grand Theft Auto: Vice City Stories, and can be heard on the in-game radio station Flash FM.

Cover versions
James Morrison recorded a version of the song for the Radio 1 Established 1967 CD. 
The song was re-worked by Chicane and released as a dance track entitled "Come Back" in 2010 and was featured on the album Giants.

See also
List of number-one hits (Belgium)
List of number-one hits of 1983 (Germany)
List of number-one singles from the 1980s (New Zealand)
List of number-one singles of the 1980s (Switzerland)

References

1981 songs
1983 singles
Paul Young songs
CBS Records singles
Number-one singles in Germany
Number-one singles in New Zealand
Number-one singles in Switzerland
Songs written by Jack Lee (musician)
Ultratop 50 Singles (Flanders) number-one singles